Max Evans may refer to:

 Max Evans (Australian footballer) (1923–2006), Australian rules footballer
 Max Evans (politician) (born 1930), former Australian politician
 Max Evans (rugby union) (born 1983), Scottish international rugby union rugby player
 Max Evans (Roswell), a fictional character in the American science fiction television series Roswell
 Max Evans (writer) (1924–2020), Western author